Josh Stewart (born October 22, 1992) is an American football wide receiver who is a free agent. He played college football at Oklahoma State.

Early years
Stewart attended John H. Guyer High School in Denton, Texas with future college teammates Jimmy Bean and J.W. Walsh. Originally committed to Texas A&M, he switched to Oklahoma State Cowboys in 2011.

College career
As a freshman in 2011, Stewart was a wide receiver and kick returner. He caught 18 passes for an average of 15.3 yards per catch. He had 261 kickoff return yards for an average of 20.1 per carry. In his sophomore year, he had 101 receptions (an average of 7.8 per game, third-best in the Big 12 Conference).
 
After his junior season, he announced he would forgo his remaining eligibility and enter the 2014 NFL Draft.

Professional career
Stewart went undrafted in the 2014 NFL Draft.

Tennessee Titans
Stewart was signed as an undrafted free agent on May 12, 2014. 24 days later, on June 5, he suffered a serious Achilles tendon injury and was subsequently placed on waivers.

Wichita Falls Nighthawks
On September 6, 2016, Stewart signed with the Wichita Falls Nighthawks for the 2017 season. He was released on February 16, 2017. On April 27, 2017, Stewart was re-signed by the Nighthawks.

References

External links
Oklahoma State Cowboys bio

1992 births
Living people
American football wide receivers
Oklahoma State Cowboys football players
Tennessee Titans players
Wichita Falls Nighthawks players
Players of American football from New Orleans